John Paston may refer to:

John Paston (died 1466) (1421–1466), of the Paston Letters, father
John Paston (died 1479) (1442–1479), of the Paston Letters, first son
John Paston (died 1504) (1444–1504), of the Paston Letters, second son

See also
Paston (disambiguation)